Holger Kimmig (born 5 March 1975) is a German retired swimmer who competed at the 1992, 1996 and 2000 Paralympic Games.

Competing in the S8 100 metre backstroke, Kimmig finished in a dead heat with David Malone and they were both awarded gold medals. They finished with a time of 1:09.90.

References

1975 births
Living people
Paralympic gold medalists for Germany
Paralympic silver medalists for Germany
Paralympic bronze medalists for Germany
Swimmers at the 1992 Summer Paralympics
Swimmers at the 1996 Summer Paralympics
Swimmers at the 2000 Summer Paralympics
Paralympic medalists in swimming
Medalists at the 1992 Summer Paralympics
Medalists at the 1996 Summer Paralympics
Medalists at the 2000 Summer Paralympics
Paralympic swimmers of Germany
German male backstroke swimmers
German male freestyle swimmers
German male medley swimmers
Medalists at the World Para Swimming Championships
S8-classified Paralympic swimmers